Nomad was an avant-garde literary magazine that Anthony Linick and Donald Factor (the son of Max Factor Jr.) edited and published in Los Angeles between 1959 and 1962. The first issue came out in the winter of 1959. Linick and Factor were particularly drawn to the poetry and writing of the Beat Generation, who wrote of their own, frequently chaotic, lives.

Nomad published work by such later famous authors and poets as:
 
 
John Ashbery
Michael Benedikt
Charles Bukowski
William Burroughs
Gregory Corso
Robert Creeley
Allen Ginsberg
LeRoi Jones
Robert Kelly
Kenneth Koch
Denise Levertov
Michael McClure
Frank O’Hara
John Perreault
Paul Raboff
Gilbert Sorrentino
Gary Snyder
Diane Wakoski
Lew Welch
Philip Whalen
Louis Zukofsky

In the literary realm, Nomad played a singular role in having published Charles Bukowski at an early date. Nomads inaugural issue in 1959 featured two of Bukowski's poems, with Nomad publishing Bukowski before his first book, Flower Fist and Bestial Wail, appeared in 1960. Nomad used Bukowski's poem So Much for the Knifers, So Much for the Bellowing Dawns as a prologue to its "Manifesto" issue, because the poem epitomized the anti-academic tone Linick and Factor wanted to feature.

The "Manifesto" issue provided a format for statements of literary philosophy. The issue included one of Bukowski's best known essays, Manifesto: A Call for Our Own Critics. It also featured, among others, a contribution by William Burroughs, who contributed a selection from Minutes to Go.

In the magazine's last issue, Nomad/New York, a special double issue (10/11, Autumn 1962), Factor wrote one of the first essays on what would become known as pop art, though he did not use term. The essay, "Four Artists", focused on Roy Lichtenstein, James Rosenquist, Jim Dine, and Claes Oldenburg. At the time Factor was a collector of the work of these artists and their contemporaries.

Also, the same issue saw John Bernard Myers, co-owner of the Tibor de Nagy Gallery, whom Factor knew from his collecting, introduce the phrase "New York School of Poetry" (as distinct from simply "New York Poets"). He used the term in his introduction to a selection of poems in the issue. He categorized the common traits of Ashbery, Kenward Elmslie, Barbara Guest, Koch, O'Hara, James Schuyler, and others, as constituting a "New York School".

Linick and Factor had equal responsibility when it came to deciding what to include in the magazine. Factor paid for publication, and the London printers were Villiers Publications, the same firm that printed Lawrence Ferlinghetti's famous City Lights Pocket Poets Series, including Ginsberg's Howl. Linick was responsible for all correspondence, solicited manuscripts from poets that he and Factor liked, managed the subscriptions, did the proofreading, and wrote all of the editorials within the magazine and the section on contributors.

Among the authors Nomad published, one stands out for his work in law, not poetry. Charles Black, who had earned a master's degree in Old and Middle English literature at Yale and wrote a thesis on Percy Bysshe Shelley as a translator of verse, became a teacher of law at Yale. He is best known for his role in the historic case Brown v. Board of Education.

Linick and Factor published eleven issues, and prepared a twelfth issue, which never appeared. The editors' lives outside Nomad had started to demand more time and commitment. Linick was completing his doctoral dissertation at UCLA, and married in 1964. In the fall of 1964 UCLA gave him a one-year appointment as an instructor in the History Department, which required that he devote extensive time to course preparation. He then moved to Michigan State University where he eventually became a tenured professor. Factor increased his involvement in the art scene, and then moved into motion pictures. The two editors lost touch with each other, before reconnecting and establishing a personal friendship many years later in London, where fortuitously both had moved. (Factor died on 15 July 2017.)

Citations

References
Birmingham, Jed (2007) "Anthony Linick on Nomad". Interview: ; Published as "NOMAD: An interview with co-editor Anthony Linick". Beat Scene No. 79, 2014, pp. 19–23.
Debritto, Abel (2013) Charles Bukowski, King of the Underground: From Obscurity to Literary Icon. (Palgrave Macmillan). 
Diggory, Terence (2013) Encyclopedia of the New York School Poets (Facts on File Library of American Literature). 

Visual arts magazines published in the United States
Avant-garde magazines
Defunct literary magazines published in the United States
Magazines established in 1959
Magazines disestablished in 1962
Magazines published in Los Angeles
Poetry magazines published in the United States
1959 establishments in California
1962 disestablishments in California
Pop art